Immaculate Machine's Fables is the third full-length album by Canadian indie rock band Immaculate Machine. Released on Mint Records on June 12, 2007, the album was available for sale on iTunes as of May 29.

Track listing

 "Jarhand" – 3:27
 "Dear Confessor" – 3:01
 "Roman Statues" – 4:05
 "Old Flame" – 4:32
 "Small Talk" – 3:42
 "Nothing Ever Happens" – 2:43
 "Northeastern Wind" – 4:31
 "C'Mon Sea Legs" – 4:02
 "Pocket" – 2:29
 "Blinding Light" – 3:42

Personnel
 Kathryn Calder – keyboards, vocals
 Brooke Gallupe – guitar, vocals
 Luke Kozlowski – drums, vocals
 John Collins – percussion, synthesizer
 Caitlin Gallupe – artwork, background vocals
 Leslie Rewega – background vocals ("Small Talk")
 Owen Pallett – violin
 Michael Olsen – cello
 Olivia Meek – musical saw ("C'mon Sea Legs")

2007 albums
Immaculate Machine albums
Mint Records albums
Albums produced by John Collins (Canadian musician)
Albums produced by David Carswell